Sereno Merrill (born September 24, 1816, in Gill, Massachusetts) was a member of the Wisconsin State Assembly during the 1876 and 1877 sessions. Additionally, he was a member of the Rock County, Wisconsin Board of Supervisors. He was a Republican.

References

People from Gill, Massachusetts
Politicians from Beloit, Wisconsin
County supervisors in Wisconsin
Republican Party members of the Wisconsin State Assembly
1816 births
Year of death missing